Peter-Herbert Frank (born 5 May 1968) is a German jurist who has been serving as Public Prosecutor General since 5 October 2015. Prior to this, he served as Attorney General of Bavaria in Munich.

Early life and education 
Frank was born in Lauda, and studied legal theory at University of Würzburg. During his studies, he joined the conservative Catholic Studentenverbindung Cheruscia Würzburg, which is associated with the Cartellverband. He completed both Staatsexamen in Würzburg with the highest possible marks. He was awarded a Doctor of Law from the University of Würzburg in 1995 in Criminal Law and Criminal Procedure. His doctorate was titled Die Verwertbarkeit rechtswidriger Tonbandaufnahmen Privater regarding the usability of illegal tape recordings by private persons.

Professional career 
In April 1995, Frank joined the Bavarian State Ministry of Justice, and over the next twenty years was rotated through a number of roles, spending a short period as State's attorney for the State's Attorney's Office of Munich I. Frank then was a member of the Bavarian Landesvertretung, representing the interests of the federal state of Bavaria to the federal government. After this, he was a judge for the first district court of Munich. In November 2006, he returned to the Bavarian Ministry of Justice, serving under Beate Merk with roles in the personnel department and leadership. From February 2010 through September 2011, he was a judge at the Higher Regional Court of Munich. In October 2011, Frank returned to the Bavarian State Ministry of Justice, where he headed the personnel department, where he was involved in or responsible for all important hires, promotions, and relocations. In March 2015, Frank was promoted to Attorney General of the Higher Regional Court of Munich. Since 2007, Frank has been the editor of the Citizen's Handbook, published by the Federal Agency for Civic Education.

Public Prosecutor General 
The government of Bavaria had planned to suggest Frank as Public Prosecutor General at the next scheduled change, which was planned for early 2016. However, Frank was nominated to the position in August 2015 by Federal Minister of Justice and Consumer Protection Heiko Maas, after Harald Range was forced to retire in the wake of the netzpolitik.org "Treason" scandal. With forty-six years he was the youngest person to assume this position. During his tenure the office took a clear opposition to right wing extremism.

Notable cases

Henriette Reker 
His first case as the Public Prosecutor General became the investigation over the stabbing of the independent politician of Henriette Reker by a right wing militant. Reker was stabbed during an election campaign after which she became elected Mayor of Cologne.

Murder of Walter Lübcke 
He also was in charge of the investigations into the murder of the acting president of the Regierungsbezirk Kassel in Hesse, Walter Lübcke, who was also the victim of a right wing militant. In 2020 Frank announced the prosecution of the captured suspect for murder.

Turkish spies 
By 2017 his department led investigations against nineteen presumed agents of the Turkish National Intelligence Organization. Several of the defendants were Imams in Mosques from the Turkish Islamic Union of Religious Affairs (DiTiB).

Other activities
 Max Planck Institute for the Study of Crime, Security and Law, Member of the Board of Trustees

Personal life 
Frank is a practicing Roman Catholic. His wife is from Margetshöchheim and teaches mathematics and physics. Together they have two daughters and one son.

References

External links 
 Peter Frank on the website of the Public Prosecutor General.
 

1968 births
Living people
People from Lauda-Königshofen
German Roman Catholics
Public Prosecutors General of Germany
21st-century German judges
Jurists from Bavaria
Cartellverband members
University of Würzburg alumni